The Concierge's Daughters (French: Les filles de la concierge) is a 1934 French comedy film directed by Jacques Tourneur and starring Jeanne Cheirel, Paul Azaïs and Josette Day.

The film's sets were designed by the art director Robert Gys.

Synopsis
The three daughters of the concierge Madame Leclerc set out to find husbands.

Cast
 Jeanne Cheirel as Madame Leclerc
 Paul Azaïs as Albert
 Josette Day as Suzanne Leclerc
 Ghislaine Bru as Lucie Leclerc
 Marcel André as Gaston Rival
 Youcca Troubetzkov as Henry Robertson
 Pierre Nay as Jacques
 Maximilienne as Mme Fallempin
 Germaine Aussey as Ginette Leclerc
 Émile Saint-Ober as Edgar

References

Bibliography 
 Waldman, Harry. Maurice Tourneur: The Life and Films. McFarland, 2001.

External links 
 

1934 films
French comedy films
French black-and-white films
1934 comedy films
1930s French-language films
Films directed by Jacques Tourneur
1930s French films